Paolo Schiavocampo (6 November 1924 – 14 January 2022) was an Italian painter and sculptor.

Biography
Schiavocampo was a student of Giacomo Manzù and studied architecture in Rome and Milan, and subsequently art history in Venice. In 1964, he stayed in New York City to work alongside Salvatore Scarpitta. His works have been acquired by various museums and collections, particularly at the Visconti Castle and the University of California, Los Angeles.

Paolo Schiavocampo died in Milan on 14 January 2022 at the age of 97.

Works
Figura

References

1924 births
2022 deaths
20th-century Italian painters
21st-century Italian painters
20th-century Italian sculptors
21st-century Italian sculptors
Artists from Palermo